This is a list of public art on permanent display in Galway City Ireland. The list applies only to public art accessible in a public space; it does not include artwork in display inside museums. Public art may include sculptures, statues, monuments, memorials, murals and mosaics.

Public art in city centre

The Claddagh

University of Galway

Past public art

See also

List of public art in Belfast
List of public art in Cork city
List of public art in Dublin
List of public art in Limerick

References

Monuments and memorials in the Republic of Ireland
Outdoor sculptures in Ireland
Culture in Galway (city)
Buildings and structures in Galway (city)
Galway
Public art
Galway (city)